David Philip Halvorson (July 9, 1948 – July 1, 2013) was an American politician.

Born in Sidney, Montana, Halvorson graduated from Williston High School in Williston, North Dakota. Halvorson received his bachelor's degree in accounting from the University of North Dakota and was in ROTC. He went to the United States Military Academy for two years for military training and studies. He then returned to Montana and was in the radio business. He was also a wheat farmer. Halvorson served in the Montana House of Representatives as a Republican from 2013 until his death from cancer. He died in Sidney, Montana.

Notes

1947 births
2013 deaths
People from Sidney, Montana
University of North Dakota alumni
United States Military Academy alumni
Businesspeople from Montana
Republican Party members of the Montana House of Representatives
Deaths from cancer in Montana
20th-century American businesspeople